Võ Việt Hùng (1960 -) is the Vietnamese film director.

Biography
Võ Việt Hùng was born in Saigon on 29 July 1960.

Career

 Chuyện chúng mình
 Long xích lô (2003)
 Công ty thời trang (2004)
 Mầm sống
 Người gác mộ (2005)
 Tiếng chuông trôi trên sông
 Love Case (2008)
 Tại tôi (2009)
 Tân Phong nữ sĩ (2009)
 Khóc thầm (2010)
 Sắc màu hạnh phúc (2011)
 Mơ hoang (2012)
 Vẫn có em bên đời (2014)
 Chữ trinh (2015)
 Thế thái nhân tình (2016)
 Con gái chị Hằng (2017)

Award
 2009 : The Golden Ochna Integerrima Award for telefilm Love Case.

References

1960 births
People from Ho Chi Minh City
Vietnamese film directors
Living people